KPOP-LP (107.7 FM) was a low-power FM radio station formerly licensed to Sapulpa, Oklahoma, United States. The station was owned by Citizenship Tulsa, Inc.

History
The Federal Communications Commission issued a construction permit for the station on July 23, 2003. The station was assigned the call sign KXTI-LP on September 2, 2003. On January 5, 2005, the station changed its call sign to KPOP-LP. The station received its license to cover on November 29, 2005. The license was surrendered by the owners on May 1, 2014, and cancelled by the FCC on May 5, 2014.

References

External links
 

POP-LP
POP-LP
Radio stations established in 2005
Defunct radio stations in the United States
Radio stations disestablished in 2014
2005 establishments in Oklahoma
2014 disestablishments in Oklahoma
POP-LP